Danny Dickfos (born 30 September 1970) is a former professional Australian rules footballer who played for the Brisbane Bears and Brisbane Lions in the Australian Football League.

Early life
Dickfos, of Maori descent, grew up in Brisbane Queensland.

An outstanding talent in the Queensland Australian Football League (QAFL), Dickfos played for Queensland in the 1987 Teal Cup, then played over 100 games semi-professionally for Windsor Zillmere. During this time he was made several offers by AFL clubs, which he consistently rejected.

AFL fans first knew of Dickfos when he made appearances in State of Origin matches, impressing for Queensland.

AFL career
After Brisbane Bears moderately successful few years at the Gabba, Dickfos was lured to the club as a rookie at age 26 in 1996.

After winning the best first year player award (sharing it with Clark Keating), Dickfos played 65 games for the Brisbane Bears and Brisbane Lions.

Standing an imposing 194 cm and 97 kg, he became one of the most reliable defenders in the league.  He quickly built a cult following amongst supporters of the club with his tough and uncompromising defensive style.

In 1995, he was part of the Brisbane Bears final side.

In 1997 he was given the Lions One percenter of the Year award and 5th in the Merrett-Murray Medal, behind Matthew Clarke, Nigel Lappin, Marcus Ashcroft and Justin Leppitsch. In the same year he played a key part of the club's first finals side.

The following year, he finished 8th in the club best and fairest count, equal with Brad Scott and Daryl White.

In 1999, after just a few seasons in the AFL and at age 29, Dickfos decided to return to the QAFL and the Eagles, to the disappointment of many Brisbane Lions fans.

Post AFL
He went on to win the 2000 Grogan Medal and continued to be an impressive player, playing over 250 games for the Eagles club, becoming the new record holder.

References

External links

Danny Dickfos - An Eagles Icon and Queensland Legend!
Full Points Footy Queensland Team of the Century profile for Danny Dickfos
Dickfos returns to Lions - The Age

Australian rules footballers from Queensland
Brisbane Bears players
Brisbane Lions players
Living people
Australian people of Māori descent
Zillmere Eagles Australian Football Club players
1970 births
Allies State of Origin players